Silvio Vittore Alberto Scionti (born 20 November 1882; d 22 May 1973) was an Italian-born American pianist and teacher.  Born in Acireale, Sicily, he trained at the Royal Conservatory in Naples.  He eventually settled in the United States, teaching at the American Conservatory of Music, the Chicago Musical College, and North Texas State College (now the University of North Texas College of Music) from 1942 to 1953, and privately in the Dallas area.  He performed as a soloist numerous times with the Chicago and Minneapolis orchestras, and frequently gave recitals.  In the 1920s, he toured the United States performing piano duos with former student Stell Andersen. After 1935, he and his wife Isabel toured Europe, Mexico, and the United States.  He also recorded a handful of piano rolls.

Scionti died in Rome.

Honors and awards 
 1956 — Order of the Star of Italian Solidarity, by the Italian Government

Former students 
 Stell Andersen
 Monte Hill Davis
 Ivan Davis
 Jeaneane Jo Dowis (1932–2013), married Samuel Lipman (1934–1994), pianist and co-founding editor of The New Criterion
 James Robert Floyd
 Jack Guerry
 Mary Nan Hudgins
 Jonetta Miller Hinkle
 Lucy Scarbrough
 Alice Downs
 Jonathan Woods

Published works 
 Silvio Scionti, The Road to Piano Artistry; a collection of classic and romantic compositions, with interpretative and technical comment, Carl Fischer, Inc. (©1944; ©1947)
 Silvio Scionti, Album of Selected Classics for Piano, G. Ricordi, New York (©1940)
 Silvio Scionti, Essays on Artistic Piano Playing,, compiled by Jack Guerry, University of North Texas Press (©1998) (electronic book)
 Silvio Scionti, Silvio Scionti's system of piano artistry, L'Arte pianistica, A revised exposition of all fundamental principles of piano technique, Edizioni Curci, Milan (©1961)

Discography 
 The piano artistry of Silvio and Isabel Scionti (CD), published by Jack Guerry, Louisiana State University (1990)
 Remastered from Welte-Mignon or Ampico reproducing piano rolls or from commercial 78 rpm recordings

References

1882 births
1973 deaths
People from Acireale
Italian emigrants to the United States
Roosevelt University faculty
American Conservatory of Music faculty
Italian classical pianists
Italian male pianists
American classical pianists
Male classical pianists
American male pianists
Texas classical music
University of North Texas College of Music faculty
20th-century classical pianists
20th-century Italian male musicians
20th-century American pianists